Leisure Noise is the first album by London band Gay Dad, released via London Records and Sire Records on 7 June 1999. The album is a blending of glam rock, neo-psychedelia, krautrock and gospel into indie pop. Lyrically it is often about and constructed of rock history. The track-listing was designed to mimic the traditional two-sided vinyl.

Chris Hughes produced the album, except for "To Earth with Love", which was produced by Tony Visconti and Mark Frith. Gary Langan handled recording and mixing; Howie Weinberg mastered the album at Masterdisc in New York City.

In 2014, NME included the album in its list of "30 Glorious Britpop Albums That Deserve a Reissue Pronto," saying "A music journalist turned rock star? It’ll never catch on… Hmmm, back in a sec… Anyway, Face scribe Cliff Jones might've cut a faintly ridiculous figure but he had the looks and – in "Joy!" and "To Earth with Love" – songs that could light up any Cool Britannic indie dancefloor. Just imagine those brash cuts freshly remastered."

Critical response

Accolades

Track listing
All tracks written by Nicholas Crowe, Cliff Jones, Nigel Hoyle and James Riseboro, except where noted.

"Dimstar" – 5:14
"Joy!" – 5:00
"Oh Jim" – 2:46
"My Son Mystic" – 3:25
"Black Ghost" (Crowe, Jones, Hoyle, Jim Irvin, Riseboro) – 7:35
"To Earth with Love" – 5:04
"Dateline" – 4:43
"Pathfinder" – 3:56
"Different Kind of Blue" (Crowe, Jones, Hoyle, Irvin, Riseboro) – 4:51
"Jesus Christ" (Crowe, Jones, Hoyle, Irvin, Riseboro)  – 4:16

Personnel
Personnel per booklet.

Gay Dad
Cliff Jones
James Riseboro
Nicholas Crowe
Nigel Hoyle

Additional musicians
 Carol Kenyon – additional vocals (tracks 2 and 10)
 Guy Barker – horns (track 7)
 Lynton Naiff – horn arrangement (track 7)

Production
 Chris Hughes – producer (all tracks except 6)
 Tony Visconti – producer (track 6)
 Mark Frith – co-producer
 Gary Langan - recording, mixing
 Howie Weinberg – mastering

Design
 Peter Saville – graphic art
 Paul Hetherington – graphic art
 Howard Wakefield – graphic art
 Paul Barnes – logo concept

References

1999 debut albums
Gay Dad albums
Albums produced by Chris Hughes (musician)
Albums produced by Tony Visconti
London Records albums
Sire Records albums